Gail Grainger is an English actress best remembered for her role as Moira Plunkett, a travel courier, in the 1972 comedy film Carry On Abroad.

Background
Gail Grainger took up dancing at the age of six and studied at a theatrical school. She had television roles in her teens in the BBC’s production of Gilbert and Sullivan’s Iolanthe and in ATV’s daily serial Crossroads.

Carry on Abroad

In Carry On Abroad (1972), Gail played Miss Moira Plunkett, an  assistant to tour courier Stuart Farquhar (Kenneth Williams), a character type often played by Valerie Leon in earlier Carry On films. The couriers led a party that included Sid James, Joan Sims, Charles Hawtrey, Barbara Windsor, Kenneth Connor, June Whitfield, Sally Geeson, Carol Hawkins and Bernard Bresslaw on a weekend trip to the Spanish holiday resort of Elsbels. Her phlegmatic and slightly bemused approach to a series of disastrous situations culminated in her extricating the party from a foreign jail by making advances to the local police chief. In some ways this was a stereotypical Carry On part: a young woman in a uniform who, from time to time, was reduced to a state of semi-undress, as, for example, when the touring party consumed an elixir with pronounced aphrodisiacal qualities.

Other roles
On stage, Gail played three parts - a fantasy maid, a nurse and a member of a female gang led by Kate O'Mara as Madame Gerda - in a 1971 play entitled Dead Duck produced by Leslie Phillips, based on the television series The Avengers. This was first performed in Birmingham and later at the Prince of Wales Theatre in London. She subsequently appeared with Leslie Phillips, and under his direction, in Joyce Rayburn’s comedy The Man Most Likely To ..., both at the Duke of York's Theatre in London and on a world tour. The Man Most Likely To ... opened initially at the Vaudeville Theatre, on 4 July 1968, and ran to over 1,000 performances in London.

She also appeared in episodes of a number of television series, including Casanova '73 (also with Leslie Phillips, 1973), Warship (as Heather Gardiner in the episode "The Man from the Sea", 1974), The Sweeney (as Carter's girlfriend Jill in the episode "The Sweet Smell of Succession", 1976), Butterflies (1979) and Rings on Their Fingers (1980). Her last film role to date was as Consuela in the Joe Lewis action film Jaguar Lives! (1979).

References

External links
 Photographs of Dead Duck (1971)

Living people
English film actresses
English stage actresses
People from Chelsea, London
1950 births
Actresses from London
20th-century English actresses
Actresses from Brighton